Hubáček (feminine Hubáčková) is a Czech surname, it may refer to:
 Alenka Hubacek, Czech-Australian tennis player
 Anna Hubáčková, Czech politician
 David Hubáček, Czech footballer
 Ida Hubáčková, Czech field hockey player
 Karel Hubáček, Czech architect
 Petr Hubáček, Czech ice hockey player
 Radek Hubáček, Czech ice hockey player
 Vladimír Hubáček, Czech rally driver

Czech-language surnames